Paul Victor (born September 8, 1965 in Castries, St. Lucia) is an American guitarist, singer and songwriter.

Victor has described his style as a mix of fusion, soul, rock, and blues, using amount a lot of sweeping and legato in his playing. His main influences are Al Di Meola, Jimi Hendrix, Tony MacAlpine, J. J. Cale, Yngwie Malmsteen and Paul Gilbert.

Music career
Victor was born on the island of St Lucia. At the age of seven, he started playing guitar. He attended high school in the USVI where he played guitar in the jazz band. He went to college in Minnesota, where he performed regularly and had the opportunity to open for BeBe Winans and White Heart. In 1987, he was asked to audition for a funk band called FTE (created out of "The Time" Fame).

Victor was soon asked to be the guitar teacher for Mercedes, an all-female band produced by Jimmy Jam and Terry Lewis. During this time, he was a sought-after studio musician in Minneapolis and was asked to join the band Alice. In 1991, he won the second of his four Guitar Wars contests. In the late 90s, Victor played to sold out shows with the musical Beehive, a theatrical production about women who shaped music from the 60's to the 70's. He also played two concert events for Ron Kenoly.

In 2006 and 2007, Victor played concerts with Hillsong Church, led by Darlene Zschech, and by 2009, he was approached by Quickstar Productions to use his song "Send Me an Angel" on their compilation CD Unified by Grace, a project in which proceeds would go to help orphanages in Africa. He completed and released his solo CD, Time Machine in 2010.

Discography 
 A Night to Worship - Grace Christian Center (1998)
 I Come to Celebrate - Shoreline Christian Center (2006)
 Jan Goss (2006)
 Time Machine (2010)

References

External links 
 Official site

Living people
1965 births
Musicians from Austin, Texas